An astronomer is a scientist in the field of astronomy who focuses their studies on a specific question or field outside the scope of Earth. They observe astronomical objects such as stars, planets, moons, comets and galaxies – in either observational (by analyzing the data) or theoretical astronomy. Examples of topics or fields astronomers study include planetary science, solar astronomy, the origin or evolution of stars, or the formation of galaxies. A related but distinct subject is physical cosmology, which studies the Universe as a whole.

Types
Astronomers usually fall under either of two main types: observational and theoretical. Observational astronomers make direct observations of celestial objects and analyze the data. In contrast, theoretical astronomers create and investigate models of things that cannot be observed. Because it takes millions to billions of years for a system of stars or a galaxy to complete a life cycle, astronomers must observe snapshots of different systems at unique points in their evolution to determine how they form, evolve, and die. They use this data to create models or simulations to theorize how different celestial objects work.

Further subcategories under these two main branches of astronomy include planetary astronomy, galactic astronomy, or physical cosmology.

Academic 

Historically, astronomy was more concerned with the classification and description of phenomena in the sky, while astrophysics attempted to explain these phenomena and the differences between them using physical laws. Today, that distinction has mostly disappeared and the terms "astronomer" and "astrophysicist" are interchangeable. Professional astronomers are highly educated individuals who typically have a PhD in physics or astronomy and are employed by research institutions or universities. They spend the majority of their time working on research, although they quite often have other duties such as teaching, building instruments, or aiding in the operation of an observatory.

The American Astronomical Society, which is the major organization of professional astronomers in North America, has approximately 7,000 members. This number includes scientists from other fields such as physics, geology, and engineering, whose research interests are closely related to astronomy. The International Astronomical Union comprises almost 10,145 members from 70 countries who are involved in astronomical research at the PhD level and beyond.

Contrary to the classical image of an old astronomer peering through a telescope through the dark hours of the night, it is far more common to use a charge-coupled device (CCD) camera to record a long, deep exposure, allowing a more sensitive image to be created because the light is added over time. Before CCDs, photographic plates were a common method of observation. Modern astronomers spend relatively little time at telescopes usually just a few weeks per year. Analysis of observed phenomena, along with making predictions as to the causes of what they observe, takes the majority of observational astronomers' time.

Astronomers who serve as faculty spend much of their time teaching undergraduate and graduate classes. Most universities also have outreach programs including public telescope time and sometimes planetariums as a public service to encourage interest in the field.

Those who become astronomers usually have a broad background in maths, sciences and computing in high school. Taking courses that teach how to research, write, and present papers are also invaluable. In college/university most astronomers get a PhD in astronomy or physics.

Amateur astronomers 

While there is a relatively low number of professional astronomers, the field is popular among amateurs. Most cities have amateur astronomy clubs that meet on a regular basis and often host star parties. The Astronomical Society of the Pacific is the largest general astronomical society in the world, comprising both professional and amateur astronomers as well as educators from 70 different nations. Like any hobby, most people who think of themselves as amateur astronomers may devote a few hours a month to stargazing and reading the latest developments in research. However, amateurs span the range from so-called "armchair astronomers" to the very ambitious, who own science-grade telescopes and instruments with which they are able to make their own discoveries and assist professional astronomers in research.

See also 
 List of astronomers
 List of women astronomers
 List of Muslim astronomers
 List of French astronomers
 List of Hungarian astronomers
 List of Russian astronomers and astrophysicists
 List of Slovenian astronomers

References

Sources

External links 
 American Astronomical Society
 European Astronomical Society
 International Astronomical Union
 Astronomical Society of the Pacific
 Space's astronomy news

Astronomy
 
Science occupations